John Colhoun  (born 15 May 1913, Castlederg, County Tyrone, Northern Ireland – 5 January 2002, Stockport, Cheshire, England) was a British mycologist, phytopathologist, and professor of cryptogamic botany. For a one-year term from 1963 to 1964 he was the president of the British Mycological Society.

Biology
Born into a farming family, John Colhoun preferred an academic approach to agriculture. In 1930 he matriculated at Queen's University Belfast (QUB). There he graduated in 1933 with a B.Sc. in botany, in 1934 with a degree in agricultural botany with first class honours, and in 1937 with an M.Agr. in mycology and plant pathology. His M.Agr. thesis is entitled Biological Studies on the Apple Fruit Crop. Supported by research assistantships at QUB and at the Ministry of Agriculture for Northern Ireland, he did research from 1934 to 1940 at Imperial College London and at QUB. The research concerned how nutrition and nitrogen content are related to the growth of fungal pathogens that damage apples. Colhoun's researrch lead in 1940 to his Ph.D. from Imperial College London.

Colhoun held an appointment from 1938 to 1940 as assistant lecturer in QUB's department of agricultural botany and from 1940 to 1954 as assistant lecturer in both the department of agricultural botany and the department of mycology and plant pathology. From 1939 to 1960 he held a concurrent post in the Plant Pathology Division of the Ministry of Agriculture of Northern Ireland. In 1954 he was appointed a reader at QUB. During the 1940s, he collaborated  with Arthur Edmund Muskett on diseases of flax, which during WW II was an economically important crop in Northern Ireland. During the 1950s Colhoun did research on the clubroot pathogen infecting plants of the family Brassicaceae. During his early years at QUB, he made frequent radio appearances giving information on plant pathology to listeners interested in gardening. At QUB he did research on fungal physiology and how plant diseases can be influenced by plant environment. He studied the control of the diseases of economically important plants and worked with geneticists in a programme to breed disease-resistant plants.

In 1960 Colhoun moved, with his family, to England when he was appointed to the University of Manchester's professorial chair of cryptogamic botany. His predecessor in the chair was Claude Wardlaw. Colhoun held his professorial appointment until 1980 when he retired as professor emeritus.

William Brown (1888–1975) was the doctoral advisor of Colhoun, who received both Ph.D. and D.Sc. from Imperial College London. There a tribute in July 1968 honoured Brown during the First International Congress of Plant Pathology. On the 20th of  July, the Federation of British Plant Pathologists gave a reception for all the members of the congress. At the reception, Colhoun, the president of the federation and acting in its behalf, made a presentation to Brown.

During the 20 years of Colhoun's professorship in Manchester, he or his colleagues trained over 70 postdoctoral students in phytopathology. At the University of Manchester, he did research on plant pathogens in the genera Fusarium, Phytophthora, Septoria, and Phoma and diseases of economically important plant species, including cereals, chrysanthemum, yam, oil palm, and banana. Overseas governments invited him to provide expert advice on vascular wilt disease. During his overseas trips he became familiar with diseases of date palms in Algeria and of oil palms in Nigeria. His familiarity with such diseases led to the creation of northern England's hottest and brightest glasshouses.

He travelled in the UK and abroad photographing and recording historic gardens and gave many lectures on such gardens. He belonged to three London clubs: Athenaeum, Authors', and Farmers.

Colhoun married in 1949. He and his wife Margaret (1921–1997) had four daughters, the eldest of whom died in 1997 shortly before Margaret died. Upon his death in 2002, he was survived by three daughters.

Selected publications

Articles
 
 
 
 
 
 
 
 
 
 
 
 
 
  (1st edition 1979)

Monographs

References

1913 births
2002 deaths
People from Castlederg
People educated at Annan Academy
Alumni of Queen's University Belfast
Alumni of Imperial College London
Academics of Queen's University Belfast
Academics of the University of Manchester
British mycologists
British phytopathologists
Fellows of the Linnean Society of London